Renee Mancuso is an American bridge player.

Bridge accomplishments

Wins

 North American Bridge Championships (6)
 Lebhar IMP Pairs (1) 1990 
 Wagar Women's Knockout Teams (3) 1997, 2002, 2004 
 Keohane North American Swiss Teams (1) 2005 
 Chicago Mixed Board-a-Match (1) 1994

Runners-up

 North American Bridge Championships
 von Zedtwitz Life Master Pairs (1) 2007 
 Wernher Open Pairs (1) 2002 
 Smith Life Master Women's Pairs (1) 1988 
 Machlin Women's Swiss Teams (3) 1988, 1992, 2005 
 Wagar Women's Knockout Teams (1) 2009 
 Sternberg Women's Board-a-Match Teams (2) 1997, 2004

References

External links
 

Living people
Year of birth missing (living people)
Place of birth missing (living people)
American contract bridge players